Santa Rosa National Park, is a national park, in Guanacaste Province, northwestern Costa Rica, it was created in 1966 by decree 3694.

Geography

It is part of the Area de Conservación Guanacaste World Heritage Site, originally created to protect the scene of the Battle of Santa Rosa. It is also within the larger national Guanacaste Conservation Area.

The Route 1 (North Interamerican Highway segment within Costa Rica of the Pan-American Highway) is along its eastern edge, where the adjacent Guanacaste National Park is located. 

Route 913 is completely within the park.

History
Santa Rosa was originally a farm located in the north-western Guanacaste Province, in Costa Rica. Today an old hacienda building, "La Casona," functions as the monument commemorating the fallen heroes of the different battles that took place here.

Battle of Santa Rosa 
Primarily, Costa Rica remembers the Battle of Santa Rosa won by their army over the forces of filibuster William Walker. On March 20, 1856, when the Costa Rican forces reached this point, the filibusters were housed in the main farm building, La Casona. The ensuing battle lasted all of 14 minutes with the national militia victorious in ousting the invaders.

The farm however kept for years its strategic significance. This place was the location of two more battles of Costa Rican forces against invading forces from Nicaragua. In 1919, there was an attempt from the invaders to overthrow the dictatorship of General Federico Tinoco Granados; and in the 1955, Costa Ricans fought intruders supporting a coup attempt against the government of José Figueres.

Natural history
Santa Rosa National Park was also created to protect the natural environment beyond the historical site.

Flora
Ten unique natural habitats are within in the park. They include savannas, deciduous forest, marshlands, and mangrove woodlands.

Areas of the Isthmian–Pacific moist forests ecoregion, similar to the Isthmian–Atlantic moist forests ecoregion and both of the tropical and subtropical moist broadleaf forests biome;  and Moist Pacific Coast mangroves ecoregions similar to the Mosquitia–Nicaraguan Caribbean Coast mangroves ecoregion and both of the mangrove biome; and Central American dry forests biome habitats — are protected here.

Fauna
Fauna includes coyotes, peccaries, white-nosed coatis, Baird's tapirs, sea turtles, and terrestrial turtles. The three species of monkey are Geoffroy's spider monkey, mantled howler and Panamanian white-faced capuchin.

Several cat species are also present: jaguarundi, ocelot, cougar and jaguar. They are rarely seen.

Around 250 bird species and 115 mammal species are found within the park.

Ramsar sites

Two Ramsar sites are located within the park, Laguna Respringue and Manglar de Potrero Grande.

See also
Guanacaste Conservation Area
Area de Conservación Guanacaste World Heritage Site

References

External links 

 Santa Rosa National Park at Costa Rica National Parks
 Santa Rosa National Park at Costa Rica Bureau
 Overview of the park from Moon Handbooks

National parks of Costa Rica
Ramsar sites in Costa Rica
Geography of Guanacaste Province
Protected areas established in 1966
Tourist attractions in Guanacaste Province
Central American dry forests